The Huarmey River in Peru is a seasonal river, with flows in the months of December to March; along with the underground water it is a vital source for the agricultural activities, industrial and domestic in the region.

The delta is an important agricultural area while the irrigation water in this arid zone is derived from the Huarmey river. Without irrigation by river water agriculture would not be possible. However, the natural underground drainage of the area is limited, and for this reason the lower parts of the delta have become waterlogged and salinized.

To overcome this problem, the installation of wells to abstract groundwater for supplemental irrigation and lowering of the water table, and drainage by ditches and wells to evacuate the salty percolation water, is being implemented.

See also
List of rivers of Peru
List of rivers of the Americas by coastline

References

Rivers of Peru
Rivers of Ancash Region